Deori is a Large Village and a municipal council in Gondia district  in the state of Maharashtra, India.

Demographics 
As per Indian government census of 2011, the population was 14579.

Geography
It has an average elevation of 340 metres (1118 feet).

It is located at the Maharashtra-Chhattisgarh border on Hajira-Kolkatta National Highway 6.

References

Cities and towns in Gondia district
Talukas in Maharashtra